Daphnella graminea is a species of sea snail, a marine gastropod mollusc in the family Raphitomidae.

Description
The length of the shell varies between 9 mm and 14 mm.

Distribution
This marine species was found off Cebu, Philippines.

References

 Stahlschmidt P., Poppe G.T. & Chino M. (2014) Description of seven new Daphnella species from the Philippines (Gastropoda: Raphitomidae). Visaya 4(2): 29-38. page(s): 32.

External links
 Gastropods.com: Daphnella graminea

graminea
Gastropods described in 2014